Admiral Sir Max Kennedy Horton,  (29 November 1883 – 30 July 1951) was a British submariner during the First World War and commander-in-chief of the Western Approaches in the later half of the Second World War, responsible for British participation in the Battle of the Atlantic.

Early life
Max Horton was born in Anglesey to Robert Joseph Angel Horton and Esther/Hester Maude Goldsmid, of the famous Goldsmid/D'Avigdor Goldsmid Anglo-Jewish family.

Horton joined the Royal Navy officer training ship, HMS Britannia on 15 September 1898.

First World War
The outbreak of war saw Lieutenant-Commander Horton in command of one of the first British ocean-going submarines, the 800-ton . At dawn on 13 September 1914, he torpedoed the German light cruiser  six miles southwest of Heligoland. Hela was hit amidships with the two torpedoes, fired from a range of 600 yards. Although pursued most of the day by German naval forces, E9 managed to reach Harwich safely. Entering the port, Horton initiated the tradition of British submariners of hoisting the Jolly Roger after a successful patrol.

For sinking the cruiser and the destroyer, Horton was awarded the Distinguished Service Order (DSO).

Sent to the Baltic Sea as part of a British flotilla, Horton sank a number of merchant vessels and, on 2 July 1915, damaged the German armoured cruiser SMS Prinz Adalbert. On 31 December 1914, Horton was promoted to Commander.

In 1917, Horton was awarded the bar to his DSO for long and arduous services in command of overseas submarines. Three years later, as a captain, he was awarded a second bar to his DSO for distinguished service in command of the Baltic submarine flotilla.

Interbellum
During the 1920s, Horton served as captain of HMS Conquest and of the battleship HMS Resolution. Promoted to rear admiral on 17 October 1932, he became Commander of the 2nd Battle Squadron with his flag in the battleship HMS Malaya in December 1933 and Commander of the 1st Cruiser Squadron with his flag in HMS London in 1935. Promoted to vice admiral in 1937, he was given command of the Reserve Fleet that year.

Second World War
With the onset of World War II, Horton was put in command of the Northern Patrol enforcing the distant maritime blockade of Germany in the seas between Orkney and the Faroes. In 1940, he was made Rear Admiral Submarines. In the opinion of Horton's biographer, Rear Admiral William Scott Chalmers, a new regulation which required the post holder to be an officer who had served aboard submarines in the Great War, was forced through for the sole purpose of ensuring that Horton was on a very short list of qualifiers for this post, almost ensuring his rapid transfer to Aberdour, so great was the desire of some within the Admiralty to have Horton revitalize the submarine arm.

Horton moved his headquarters from Aberdour, where he was under the control of the fleet commanders at Scapa Flow, to Northways in north London, officially because he wanted a freer hand in running his command, but purportedly because Northways was located near some of his favourite golf courses. Horton, an avid golfer, is said to have played a round of golf almost every day during the war (since most of the convoy battles took place at night), and was generously handicapped at a "financial 8".

He was responsible for the creation of convoy rescue ships, which accompanied some Atlantic convoys to rescue survivors from ships sunk by enemy action. Rescue ships were typically small freighters with passenger accommodations. Conversion to rescue service involved enlarging galley and food storage areas and providing berthing and sanitary facilities for approximately 150 men. The ships carried scrambling nets along the sides, and boats suitable for open sea work instead of normal lifeboats. Rescue ships normally included a small operating room for an embarked naval doctor and sick bay staff.

Having been promoted to full Admiral on 9 January 1941, Horton was appointed Commander-in-Chief, Western Approaches Command on 17 November 1942. Here he instituted a series of tactical changes in the way the escort ships were to be used. In addition to the existing escort group system, in which groups of ships were assigned to defend the perimeter of convoy boxes, Horton instituted a system of support groups, who would also travel with the convoys, but have much more freedom in pursuing submarines to the death, even if such action necessitated leaving the convoy for longer periods of time than were considered acceptable for escort groups. Horton's support groups proved to be decisive in the crucial spring of 1943, taking the battle to the U-boats and crushing the morale of the U-boat arm with persistent and successful counterattacks. Horton is widely credited, along with his predecessor, Admiral Sir Percy Noble, as being one of the most crucial figures in the Allied victory in the Atlantic. In August 1945, Max Horton, at his own request, was placed on the retired list in order to facilitate the promotion of younger officers. He was made a Knight Grand Cross of the Order of the Bath in June 1945 and was Bath King of Arms from January 1946. He was awarded the Freedom of the City of Liverpool.

Memorials
There is a memorial to him in Liverpool Cathedral.

In 2019, a full size sculpture of Horton was funded by the Rhosneigr community and placed in Rhosneigr, where he was born.  

In 2021 a footstone was funded by the Jewish American Society for Historic Preservation in his honour. The footstone reads, "Admiral Sir Max Horton, RN, Honouring British Commonality and Diversity, Commander-in-Chief responsible for British participation in the Battle of the Atlantic WWII. Admiral Horton was of Jewish heritage born in Anglesey. 'Be strong and of good courage' Joshua 1:9, Donated by the Hackney Branch of the Association of Jewish Ex-Servicemen and Women and the Jewish American Society for Historic Preservation."

Honours and awards

 Knight Grand Cross of the Order of the Bath (14 June 1945, King's Birthday Honours); KCB (2 January 1939, New Year Honours); CB (4 June 1934, Birthday Honours)
 Distinguished Service Order and two bars (21 October 1914, highly successful attacks on German men-of-war; 2 November 1917, for long and arduous services in command of overseas submarines; 8 March 1920, distinguished service in command of the Baltic submarine flotilla)
 Mention in Despatches (11 July 1940)
 The Board of Trade Medal for Saving Life at Sea in silver (1911)
 Order of St. George, 4th Class (Russia) (LG 15 November 1915)
 Grand Officer of the Legion of Honour (France)
 Croix de Guerre with Palmes (France)
 Order of St. Vladimir 4th Class with swords (Russia)
 Order of St. Anna, 2nd Class with swords and diamonds (Russia)
 Order of St. Stanislaus 2nd Class
 Grand Cross of the Order of Orange-Nassau (Netherlands, 12 May 1942)
 Chief Commander of Legion of Merit (USA, 28 May 1946)
 Grand Cross of the Order of St. Olaf (Norway, 13 January 1948; services to Norway)

References

Sources

|-

|-

1883 births
1951 deaths
Royal Navy submarine commanders
Royal Navy admirals of World War II
Royal Navy admirals
Chief Commanders of the Legion of Merit
Recipients of the Croix de Guerre 1939–1945 (France)
Grand Officiers of the Légion d'honneur
Recipients of the Order of St. Vladimir, 4th class
Recipients of the Order of St. Anna, 2nd class
Knights Grand Cross of the Order of Orange-Nassau
Royal Navy officers of World War I
Recipients of the Sea Gallantry Medal